The 189th Infantry Division was a reserve division of the German Army in World War II.

Operational history
September 26, 1942: Formation of the 189. Reserve-Division
December 6, 1942: The 189. Reserve-Division is renamed 189. Infanterie-Division (B)
May 15, 1943: The 189. Reserve-Division is reformed in France from Division Nr. 189. In 1944, it fought against the Allied landings in Operation Dragoon in the South of France and suffered heavy losses.
October 8, 1944: The 189. Infanterie-Division was reformed in France from the 189. Reserve-Division and the 242. Infanterie-Division.
February 1945: The 189. Infantry-Division is destroyed in the Colmar Pocket.
March 1945: The 189. Infantry-Division was reformed again and fought in southern Germany until the end of the war.

Order of battle
1944
15th Reserve Grenadier Regiment (two battalions)
28th Reserve Grenadier Regiment (three battalions)
28th Reserve Artillery Battalion
9th Reserve Pioneer Battalion
1089th Administrative Service Unit

1945
1007th Security Battalion
1021st Security Battalion
1181st Artillery Battalion
806th SS-Machinegun Battalion

Commanders
Major General Paul Bauer (October 1939 - June 1942)
Major General Egon von Neindorff (June 1942 - October 1943)
Lieutenant General Richard von Schwerin (October 1943 - September 1944)
Major General Ernst von Bauer (September - October 1944)
Major General Joachim Degener (October - November 1944)
Colonel Eduard Zorn (November 1944 - February 1945), KIA
Colonel Mellwig (February - April 1945)

References

Infantry divisions of Germany during World War II